Protographium philolaus, the dark zebra swallowtail or dark kite-swallowtail, is a butterfly of the family Papilionidae. It is found from southern Texas to northern South America.

The wingspan is 90–95 mm. There are broad black bars on the upper surface of the forewings of the males. Females are similar, although some are almost completely black. Both sexes have long tails. Adults feed on flower nectar.

"Antenna black; the 7. pale green band of the forewing only represented  by a spot; hindwing with 2 red spots posteriorly; on the under surface the red line of the hindwing edged with black at both sides, undulate anteriorly. Scent-scales of the male short, broad, irregular, produced in a number of filaments. The female is in 2 forms:  female f. philolaus Boisd. similar to the male, the underside paler, female f. niger Eimer (nigrescens Eimer; felicis Fruhst.) the pale green bands of the membrane of the wings scaled with black, the wings therefore black with slight traces of the bands."

Biology

The butterfly is found in low situations, often resting in crowds on the sand at the edge of rivers. The larvae feed on Annonaceae species.

Subspecies
There are two recognised subspecies:
Protographium philolaus philolaus (Mexico, Honduras, Costa Rica, southern Texas) 
Protographium philolaus xanticles (Bates, 1863) (Panama, northern Colombia, northern Venezuela)

References

Further reading

Edwin Möhn, 2002 Schmetterlinge der Erde, Butterflies of the world Part XIIII (14), Papilionidae VIII: Baronia, Euryades, Protographium, Neographium, Eurytides. Edited by Erich Bauer and Thomas Frankenbach Keltern: Goecke & Evers; Canterbury: Hillside Books.  All species and subspecies are included, also most of the forms. Several females are shown the first time in colour.

Protographium
Butterflies described in 1836
Papilionidae of South America
Taxa named by Jean Baptiste Boisduval